Thania Paffenholz, born on 2 February 1965 in Cologne, Germany, is an academic and policy advisor working on peace processes. She is currently Director of Inclusive Peace (previously Inclusive Peace and Transition Initiative at the Graduate Institute Geneva). Thania Paffenholz has led comparative research of peace processes for over two decades and has been an advisor in peace processes in Mozambique, Angola, Somalia, Kenya, Uganda, South Sudan, Mali, Afghanistan, Nepal, Sri Lanka, Myanmar, Yemen, Egypt, El Salvador, Syria and Colombia. She received the Wihuri International Prize in 2015 for her work as a peace researcher.

Biography 
Thania Paffenholz has roots in Europe, Africa and Asia and lives in Switzerland. She obtained her Ph.D. in international relations from Goethe University Frankfurt, Germany in 1996, focusing on the theory and practice of mediation and peacebuilding in armed conflicts. From 1992 to 1996, she was a research fellow at the Peace Research Institute Frankfurt and participated in several United Nations' missions in Africa. From 1996 to 2000, she worked as peacebuilding advisor to the European Union Special Envoy to Somalia. She then served as founding Director of the Center for Peacebuilding at Swisspeace in Berne,  advising the Swiss Foreign Ministry. Since 2005, Dr Paffenholz has worked with the Graduate Institute in Geneva, while advising the United Nations, the European Union, the OECD, the OSCE, governments and non-governmental organizations.

Research projects

Broadening participation in political negotiations 
Since 2011, Thania Paffenholz is leading a comparative analysis of over forty peace and political transition processes, looking at the role, modalities, and impact of various actors involved in negotiations, including civil society, women’s groups, minorities, political parties and armed groups. This work has informed United Nations policy initiatives, notably the United Nations Global Study on Women, Peace and Security  and the work of the United Nations High Level independent panel on United Nations Peace Operations.

Civil society and peacebuilding 
From 2005 to 2010, she led a research project on inclusion and peace processes, which resulted in the publication of the book Civil Society & Peacebuilding: A Critical Assessment (2010).

Media presence 
  Le Temps (quotidien suisse)
  Swissinfo
  Radio télévision suisse
  Tagesschau

Publications 
  Construire la paix sur le terrain; Mode d’emploi. Bruxelles: Groupe de recherche et d'information sur la paix et la sécurité, 2000.
 Unpacking the 'Local Turn' in Peacebuilding: A Critical Assessment towards an Agenda for Further Research, Third World Quarterly, 2015, 36:5, 857-874.
 Civil society and Peace Negotiations: Beyond the inclusion-exclusion dichotomy, Negotiation Journal (30) 1, January 2014, 69-91.
 International Peacebuilding Goes Local: Analysing Lederach’s Conflict Transformation Theory and its Ambivalent Encounter with 20 years of Practice, Peacebuilding, Taylor and Francis (2) 1, January 2014, 11-27.
 Civil Society and Peacebuilding: A Critical Assessment. Boulder: Lynne Rienner Publishers, 2010.
 Civil Society and Peacebuilding, CCDP Working Paper 4, Geneva: 2009 
 Aid for Peace: A Guide to Planning and Evaluation for Conflict Zones. Baden-Baden: Nomos, 2007.
 Peacebuilding: A Field Guide. Avec Luc Reychler. Boulder: Lynne Rienner Publishers, 2000.

References 

Living people
1965 births
People from Cologne
Goethe University Frankfurt alumni
Academic staff of the Graduate Institute of International and Development Studies
German expatriates in Switzerland